Willie Teal Jr. (born December 20, 1957) is a former American football cornerback in the National Football League (NFL). He was drafted by the Minnesota Vikings in the second round of the 1980 NFL Draft. He played college football at LSU. Teal also played for the Los Angeles Raiders.

References

1957 births
Living people
American football cornerbacks
LSU Tigers football players
Minnesota Vikings players
Los Angeles Raiders players